Casticin is a methoxylated flavonol, meaning the core flavonoid structure has methyl groups attached. Found in Artemisia annua, the flavonoid has been shown to enhance the antimalarial activity of artemisinin though casticin itself has no direct antimalarial effects. It has been shown to have anti-mitotic activity. It is also found in Vitex agnus-castus.

References

External links 
 

Flavones